The Matrimonial Proceedings and Property Act 1970 (c 45) is an Act of Parliament of the United Kingdom concerning court cases between married people.

Contents
The most important remaining provision is that under section 37 a court has power to vary the shares of equity in a home of a husband and wife to the extent it views to be just.

See also

English land law
English property law
Civil Partnership Act 2004 ss 65, 66, 72 and Schs 5-7

Notes

United Kingdom Acts of Parliament 1970
Property law of the United Kingdom
Marriage law in the United Kingdom